{{Infobox person
| name                    = Gerard Kennedy
| image                   = 
| imagesize               =
| caption                 =
| birth_name              =
| birth_date              = 
| birth_place             = Perth, Western Australia, Australia 
| death_date              =
| death_place             =
| othername               =
| occupation              = Actor
| yearsactive             = 1965–2015
| known_for           =  Hunter, Division 4
| notable_works = {{hlist|Homicide|Against the Wind|The Flying Doctors}}
| spouse                  =
| partner                 =
| website                 =
| awards                  = 
}}

Gerard Kennedy (born 8 March 1932) is an Australian double Gold Logie award-winning former actor, best known for his roles in early television series, in particular the espionage series including Hunter and the police procedural Division 4. Kennedy also appeared in film roles during a career that spanned 50 years in the industry.

Career

Kennedy played six different characters in guest appearances in Crawford Productions television series Homicide and in 1967 he shot to fame as the antagonist in Australian television spy drama Hunter, becoming so popular that his character changed sides, eventually becoming the main character after lead actor Tony Ward left the series. Kennedy won a TV Week Logie Award for "Best New Talent" for his portrayal of the character.

Kennedy followed this with a starring role in police procedural television series, Division 4, winning multiple Logie Awards—including two Gold Logies as most popular personality on Australian TV—for his work in the series. He has consistently acted in Australian television and film productions since that time. 

Later regular television series roles included Tandarra in 1976, Bellbird in 1977, the miniseries Against the Wind in 1978, Skyways in 1979–1981, Golden Pennies in 1985, and The Flying Doctors between 1986 and 1989 (non-consecutive episodes). Guest TV roles include appearances in Carson's Law, Prisoner, A Country Practice, Blue Heelers, City Homicide, The Saddle Club, and Neighbours. In 2008, he played Graham "The Munster" Kinniburgh in Underbelly and in Fat Tony & Co.''.

Filmography

Awards

References

External links
 

1932 births
Living people
Australian male film actors
Australian male television actors
Gold Logie winners
Male actors from Perth, Western Australia
20th-century Australian male actors
21st-century Australian male actors